Dingler may refer to:

People
 Hermann Dingler (1846-1935), a German botanist and physician
 Hugo Dingler (1881-1954), a German scientist and philosopher
 Christian Dingler (1802-1858), a German inventor and manufacturer

Other
Dingler, Alabama, a community in the United States